Lagunilla is a station along Line B of the Mexico City Metro located north of the center of Mexico City, near the famous market with the same name (next to and used interchangeably with Tepito).

The logo for the station is a wild duck.  The station was opened on 15 December 1999.

Ridership

References 

Lagunilla
Railway stations opened in 1999
1999 establishments in Mexico
Mexico City Metro stations in Cuauhtémoc, Mexico City